Claus Elming (born 20 March 1969 in Herning, Denmark) is a former Danish American football player and current TV host and commentator on TV 2 Sport.

Elming first experienced American football when he went to Minnesota as an exchange student. Learning from host brother Chuck Schrope (reference to page 5 in Claus's book bogen on Super Bowl) he quickly became a fan of the sport. Claus sent his little brother, Jesper Elming, a National Football League ball for Christmas.

Upon returning to Denmark after a year in the U.S., Claus started the Herning Hawks American football club with some other interested players. Some years later, Claus moved to Århus to study at the university, where he helped starting the Århus Tigers. Claus later moved to Copenhagen after he took a job as an NFL commentator on TV 2 Zulu. Elming then started coaching the Avedøre Monarchs, which he did until 2002.
In 2006, Elming was inducted in the Danish American Football Federation Hall of Fame.

Until the 2006 NFL season, Elming was a color commentator for TV 2 Zulu in Denmark, providing NFL-coverage alongside Jimmy Bøjgaard, who provided play-by-play-commentary. The Zulu-coverage of NFL ended thereafter, when Viasat acquired the Scandinavian NFL-rights. However, Elming will continue as commentator at TV 2 Sport, who air a portion of the NFL matches in Denmark.

Elming's favorite team is the Minnesota Vikings.

References

Bibliography 
 Bogen om NFL : amerikansk fodbold fra AFC til zone blitz (2004) 
 Bogen om Super Bowl (2006)

External links 
 Claus Elming blog at TV 2
 Claus Elming page at MySpace
 The Official Claus Elming Fan Club

1969 births
Living people
Danish players of American football
Danish television presenters
People from Herning Municipality
Sportspeople from the Central Denmark Region